Roland à Roncevaux may refer to:

Roland à Roncevaux, song by Rouget de Lisle
Roland à Roncevaux, opera by Auguste Mermet
Roland à Roncevaux, film by Louis Feuillade 1910